The Accademia di Belle Arti "Mario Sironi" di Sassari is an academy of fine arts located in Sassari, Sardinia. It was founded in 1989 and it is the more recently established Italian state academy of fine art.

References

External links
  

Art schools in Italy
Education in Sardinia
Sassari
Educational institutions established in 1989
1989 establishments in Italy